Villanueva de Algaidas is a town and municipality in the North-Eastern Malaga comarca (Nororma), province of Málaga, part of the autonomous community of Andalusia in southern Spain. The municipality is situated approximately 11 kilometres from Archidona, 30 from Antequera and 70 from the provincial capital of Málaga. It has a population of approximately 4,200 residents. The natives are called Algaideños.

People
Miguel Berrocal (1933-2006), sculptor

References

Municipalities in the Province of Málaga
Towns in Spain